Ron Robinson is an African-American chemist and researcher. He is the founder of BeautyStat.

Biography
Born in an African-American family, Robinson attended Adelphi University and graduated with a degree in chemistry and biology in 1987. Robinson briefly attended a medical school and studied medicine, but he soon realised his interests were in chemistry and left the school.

After the completion of his education, Robinson started his career as a researcher at Clinique which is part of Estée Lauder. Later, he joined Avon and worked there until 2008. His research work include the development of Clinique's skin-care line. During his career, he also worked for Revlon, Lancome, La Mer.

In 2008, Robinson started a website called BeautyStat. In 2020, he founded BeautyStat as a cosmetics company. Nordstrom included BeautyStat in their inclusive category.

In June 2022, Robinson became the chemist-in-residence of Rhode, a beauty brand started by Hailey Bieber.

References

External links
 Official website

Living people
African-American chemists
Adelphi University alumni
Year of birth missing (living people)